Not What You See may refer to:
 "Not What You See", a song by Savatage on their album Dead Winter Dead
 "Not What You See", a song by Kutless on their album Sea of Faces